Wesley Scott Benjamin (born July 26, 1993) is an American professional baseball pitcher for the KT Wiz of the KBO League. He has played in Major League Baseball (MLB) for the Texas Rangers.

Amateur career
Benjamin attended St. Charles East High School in St. Charles, Illinois. He played college baseball for the University of Kansas Jayhawks. Benjamin underwent Tommy John surgery on April 10, 2014. After his junior year of college, he was drafted by the Texas Rangers in the fifth round, 156th overall, of the 2014 Major League Baseball draft.

Professional career

Texas Rangers
Benjamin made his professional debut with the Arizona League Rangers of the Rookie-level Arizona League in 2015, appearing in one game for them. He spent the 2016 season with the Hickory Crawdads of the Class A South Atlantic League, going 6–5 with a 3.79 ERA and 101 strikeouts over 102 innings. He spent the 2017 season with the Down East Wood Ducks of the Class A-Advanced Carolina League, going 10–7 with a 3.94 ERA and 101 strikeouts over  innings pitched. Benjamin split the 2018 season between the Frisco RoughRiders of the Double-A Texas League and the AZL Rangers, going a combined 5–6 with a 3.32 ERA and 81 strikeouts over  innings. He spent the 2019 season with the Nashville Sounds of the Triple-A Pacific Coast League, going 7–6 with a 5.52 ERA and 114 strikeouts over  innings. 

Benjamin was called up to the major leagues for the first time on August 11, 2020. He made his major league debut on August 16 against the Colorado Rockies. With the Rangers in 2020, Benjamin went 2–1 with a 4.84 ERA and 21 strikeouts over  innings.

With the Round Rock Express of the Triple-A West in 2021, Benjamin went 2–5 with a 8.29 ERA. With Texas in 2021, Benjamin went 0–2 with a 8.74 ERA and 19 strikeouts over  innings. On October 3, 2021, Benjamin was designated for assignment. On October 6, he was outrighted to Round Rock.

Chicago White Sox
On February 21, 2022, Benjamin signed a minor league contract with the Chicago White Sox. He made 7 starts for the Triple-A Charlotte Knights, going 2–0 with a 3.82 ERA in  innings. On May 17, 2022, Benjamin requested and was granted his release in order to pursue an opportunity in Asia.

KT Wiz
On May 18, 2022, Benjamin signed with the KT Wiz of the KBO League. For KT in 2022, he posted a 5–4 record with a 2.70 ERA and 77 strikeouts over  innings. Benjamin re-signed with KT for the 2023 season on a $1.3 million contract.

References

External links

Kansas Jayhawks bio 

1993 births
Living people
People from Winfield, Illinois
Baseball players from Illinois
American expatriate baseball players in South Korea
Major League Baseball pitchers
KBO League pitchers
Texas Rangers players
KT Wiz players
Kansas Jayhawks baseball players
Arizona League Rangers players
Hickory Crawdads players
Down East Wood Ducks players
Frisco RoughRiders players
Nashville Sounds players
Round Rock Express players
Charlotte Knights players